The 1995 Jeep Eagle Aloha Bowl was a college football bowl game, played as part of the 1995–96 bowl game schedule of the 1995 NCAA Division I-A football season. It was the 11th Aloha Bowl.  It was played on December 25, 1995, at Aloha Stadium in Honolulu, Hawaii. The game matched the UCLA Bruins of the Pac-10 Conference against the Kansas Jayhawks of the Big 8 Conference in Terry Donahue's final game as head coach of the Bruins.

Scoring summary

First quarter
 KU—Jim Moore, nine-yard pass from Mark Williams. Jeff McCord converts.

Second quarter
 KU—June Henley, 49-yard run. McCord converts. 
 KU—McCord, 27-yard field goal.

Third quarter
 KU—Henley, two-yard run. McCord kick fails. 
UCLA—Brad Melsby, eight-yard pass from Cade McNown. Bjorn Merten converts. 
KU—Isaac Byrd, 77-yard pass from Williams. McCord converts. 
KU—Andre Carter, 27-yard pass from Williams. McCord converts.

Fourth quarter
 UCLA—Kevin Jordan, eight-yard pass from McNown. Merten converts. 
UCLA—Karim Abdul-Jabbar, five-yard run. Melsby pass from McNown. 
KU—Williams, six-yard run. McCord converts. 
UCLA—Melsby, seven-yard pass from McNown. Abdul-Jabbar run. 
KU—Eric Vann, 67-yard run. McCord converts.

Statistics

References

Aloha Bowl
Aloha Bowl
Kansas Jayhawks football bowl games
UCLA Bruins football bowl games
December 1995 sports events in the United States
1995 in sports in Hawaii